Melanotaenia pimaensis, the Pima River rainbowfish, is a species of rainbowfish in the subfamily Melanotaeniinae. It is endemic to Papua New Guinea where it has been recorded only from the Pima River where it meets the Tua River in the Southern Highlands.

References

pimaensis
Freshwater fish of Papua New Guinea
Taxonomy articles created by Polbot
Fish described in 1981